The Battle of Órbigo (also known as the Battle of Campus Paramus) was a battle in 456 CE when the Visigoths of Theodoric II defeated the Suevi Kingdom and sacked their capital Braga. Although very little is known of the battle the defeat proved a significant blow to the Suevi who would enter a period of decline afterwards and would never fully recover their territory. 

The Suevi King Rechiar had been expanding his territory at the expense of the Romans in Hispania, who were unable stop them. The Roman Emperor Avitus requested his allies the Visigoths of Theodoric II and the Burgundians of Gondiloc and Chilperic to attack the Suebi for him. Theodoric agreed and led his army to victory against Rechiar at Orbigo.

References

456
450s conflicts
Orbigo
Orbigo
Battles in Castile and León
Orbigo
History of the province of León